The Black Light is the second studio album by American indie rock band Calexico. It was released May 19, 1998 on Quarterstick.

Track listing

Personnel
Calexico
 Joey Burns – vocals, double bass, guitar, cello, mandolin, accordion, keyboards, steel guitar, percussion 
 John Convertino – drums, vibraphone, marimba, accordion, percussion, thunder drum

Additional personnel
 Howe Gelb – piano, organ
 Nick Luca – Spanish guitar, claves
 Gabriel Landin – gitaron
 Neil Harry – pedal steel guitar
 Bridget Keating – violin
 Rigo Pedroza – trumpet
 Fernando Sanchez – trumpet
 Al Tapatio – trumpet
 Tasha Bundy – background vocals
 Stephanie Nelson – fuzz vox
 Craig Schumacher – engineering
 Nick Luca – engineering

Mixed at Wavelab Studios, Tucson, Arizona.

References

1998 albums
Calexico (band) albums
Quarterstick Records albums